This page lists all described species of the spider family Zodariidae :

A

Acanthinozodium

Acanthinozodium Denis, 1966 - Zodariinae
 A. ansieae Jocqué & van Harten, 2015 — Yemen (Socotra)
 A. cirrisulcatum Denis, 1952 — Mauritania, Morocco
 A. c. longispina Denis, 1952 — Morocco
 A. crateriferum Jocqué & Henrard, 2015 — Ethiopia
 A. quercicola Jocqué & Henrard, 2015 — Morocco
 A. sahariense Denis, 1959 — Algeria
 A. sahelense Jocqué & Henrard, 2015 — Senegal, Ivory Coast, Burkina Faso, Cameroon
 A. sericeum Denis, 1956 — Morocco
 A. spinulosum Denis, 1966 (type) — Libya
 A. subclavatum Denis, 1952 — Morocco
 A. tibesti Jocqué, 1991 — Chad
 A. zavattarii (Caporiacco, 1941) — Ethiopia

† Adjutor

Adjutor Petrunkevitch, 1942 - Incertae Sedis
 † A. deformis Petrunkevitch, 1958 — Palaeogene Baltic amber
 † A. mirabilis Petrunkevitch, 1942 (type) — Palaeogene Baltic amber

† Admissor

Admissor Petrunkevitch, 1942 - Incerta Sedis 
 † A. aculeatus Petrunkevitch, 1942 (type) — Palaeogene Baltic amber

† Adorator

Adorator Petrunkevitch, 1942 - Zodariinae
 † A. hispidus C. L. Koch & Berendt, 1854 — Palaeogene Baltic/Rovno amber
 † A. samlandicus Petrunkevitch, 1942 (type) — Palaeogene Baltic amber

Akyttara

Akyttara Jocqué, 1987 - Zodariinae
 A. akagera Jocqué, 1987 (type) — Rwanda
 A. homunculus Jocqué, 1991 — Botswana
 A. mahnerti Jocqué, 1987 — Kenya
 A. odorocci Ono, 2004 — Vietnam
 A. ritchiei Jocqué, 1987 — Kenya

Amphiledorus

Amphiledorus Jocqué & Bosmans, 2001 - Storeninae
 A. adonis Jocqué & Bosmans, 2001 — Portugal, Spain
 A. balnearius Jocqué & Bosmans, 2001 (type) — Spain, Algeria
 A. histrionicus (Simon, 1884) — Algeria, Tunisia
 A. ungoliantae Pekár & Cardoso, 2005 — Portugal

† Angusdarion

Angusdarion Wunderlich, 2004 - Zodariinae
 † A. humilis Wunderlich, 2004 (type) — Palaeogene Baltic amber

† Anniculus

Anniculus Petrunkevitch, 1942 - Incertae Sedis
 † A. balticus Petrunkevitch, 1942 (type) — Palaeogene Baltic amber

Antillorena

Antillorena Jocqué, 1991 - Lachesaninae
 A. gaia Brescovit & Ruiz, 2011 — Brazil
 A. patapata Brescovit & Ruiz, 2011 — Brazil
 A. polli (Simon, 1887) (type) — Lesser Antilles, Bahamas
 A. sanjacintensis Quijano-Cuervo & Brescovit, 2018 — Colombia

Asceua

Asceua Thorell, 1887 - Storeninae
Asceua adunca B. S. Zhang & F. Zhang, 2018 — Laos
Asceua amabilis Thorell, 1897 — Myanmar
Asceua anding Zhang, Zhang & Jia, 2012 — China
Asceua bifurca B. S. Zhang & F. Zhang, 2018 — Borneo
Asceua bimaculata (Simon, 1904) — Vietnam
Asceua calciformis (Li, Liu & Peng, 2022) — China
Asceua cingulata (Simon, 1905) — India
Asceua curva B. S. Zhang & F. Zhang, 2018 — Borneo
Asceua daoxian Yin, 2012 — China
Asceua digitata (Li, Liu & Peng, 2022) — China
Asceua dispar (Kulczyński, 1911) — Java
Asceua elegans Thorell, 1887 — Myanmar
Asceua expugnatrix Jocqué, 1995 — Australia
Asceua forcipiformis (Li, Liu & Peng, 2022) — China
Asceua gruezoi Barrion & Litsinger, 1992 — Philippines
Asceua heliophila (Simon, 1893) — Philippines
Asceua japonica (Bösenberg & Strand, 1906) — Japan
Asceua jianfeng Song & Kim, 1997 — China
Asceua kunming Song & Kim, 1997 — China
Asceua lejeunei Jocqué, 1991 — Congo
Asceua longji Barrion-Dupo, Barrion & Heong, 2013 — China
Asceua maculosa Logunov, 2010 — Vietnam
Asceua menglun Song & Kim, 1997 — China
Asceua piperata Ono, 2004 — Laos, Vietnam
Asceua quadrimaculata Zhang, Zhang & Jia, 2012 — China
Asceua quinquestrigata (Simon, 1905) — Java
Asceua radiosa Jocqué, 1986 — Comoros, Mayotte
Asceua septemmaculata (Simon, 1893) — Cambodia
Asceua similis Song & Kim, 1997 — China
Asceua torquata (Simon, 1909) — China, Laos, Vietnam
Asceua trimaculata B. S. Zhang & F. Zhang, 2018 — Malaysia
Asceua wallacei Bosmans & Hillyard, 1990 — Sulawesi
Asceua zodarionina (Simon, 1907) — Guinea-Bissau

Aschema

Aschema Jocqué, 1991 - Cydrelinae
 A. madagascariensis (Strand, 1907) — Madagascar
 A. pallida Jocqué, 1991 (type) — Madagascar

Asteron

Asteron Jocqué, 1991 - Storeninae
 A. biperforatum Jocqué & Baehr, 2001 — Australia (Queensland)
 A. grayi Jocqué & Baehr, 2001 — Australia (New South Wales)
 A. hunti Jocqué & Baehr, 2001 — Australia (New South Wales, Australian Capital Territory)
 A. inflatum Jocqué & Baehr, 2001 — Australia (Victoria)
 A. quintum Jocqué & Baehr, 2001 — Australia (Victoria)
 A. reticulatum Jocqué, 1991 (type) — Australia (Queensland, New South Wales. Victoria, Tasmania)
 A. tasmaniense Jocqué & Baehr, 2001 — Australia (Tasmania)
 A. zabkai Jocqué & Baehr, 2001 — Australia (New South Wales)

Australutica

Australutica Jocqué, 1995 - Lachesaninae
 A. africana Jocqué, 2008 — South Africa
 A. manifesta Jocqué, 1995 — Australia (South Australia)
 A. moreton Jocqué, 1995 (type) — Australia (Queensland)
 A. normanlarseni Jocqué, 2008 — South Africa
 A. quaerens Jocqué, 1995 — Australia (South Australia)
 A. xystarches Jocqué, 1995 — Australia (South Australia)

B-C

Ballomma

Ballomma Jocqué & Henrard, 2015 - Incerta Sedis
 B. erasmus Jocqué & Henrard, 2015 (type) — South Africa
 B. haddadi Jocqué & Henrard, 2015 — South Africa
 B. legala Jocqué & Henrard, 2015 — South Africa
 B. neethlingi Jocqué & Henrard, 2015 — South Africa

Basasteron

Basasteron Baehr, 2003 - Storeninae
 B. leucosemum (Rainbow, 1920) (type) — Australia (Lord Howe Is.)

Caesetius

Caesetius Simon, 1893 - Cydrelinae
 C. bevisi (Hewitt, 1916) — South Africa
 C. biprocessiger (Lawrence, 1952) — South Africa
 C. flavoplagiatus Simon, 1910 — Namibia, South Africa
 C. globicoxis (Lawrence, 1942) — South Africa
 C. inflatus Jocqué, 1991 — Mozambique, Malawi, South Africa
 C. murinus Simon, 1893 (type) — South Africa
 C. politus Simon, 1893 — South Africa
 C. rosei (Bacelar, 1953) — Mozambique
 C. schultzei Simon, 1910 — South Africa
 C. spenceri (Pocock, 1900) — South Africa

Cambonilla

Cambonilla Jocqué, 2019 - Incertae Sedis
 C. securicula Jocqué, 2019 — Cambodia, Laos
 C. symphonia Jocqué & Henrard, 2019 — Cambodia

Capheris

Capheris Simon, 1893 - Cydrelinae
 C. abrupta Jocqué, 2009 — South Africa
 C. apophysalis Lawrence, 1928 — Namibia
 C. approximata (Karsch, 1878) — Namibia, South Africa
 C. brunnea (Marx, 1893) — Congo
 C. crassimana (Simon, 1887) (type) — Angola, Botswana, Namibia, South Africa
 C. decorata Simon, 1904 — Zambia, Zimbabwe, Mozambique, South Africa
 C. fitzsimonsi Lawrence, 1936 — Zimbabwe, Botswana
 C. kunenensis Lawrence, 1927 — Namibia
 C. langi Lawrence, 1936 — Botswana, South Africa
 C. oncka Lawrence, 1927 — Angola, Namibia, Botswana
 C. subtilis Jocqué, 2009 — Namibia, Zimbabwe, South Africa

Cavasteron

Cavasteron Baehr & Jocqué, 2000 - Storeninae
 C. agelenoides Baehr & Jocqué, 2000 — Australia (Queensland)
 C. atriceps Baehr & Jocqué, 2000 — Australia (South Australia)
 C. crassicalcar Baehr & Jocqué, 2000 — Australia (Western Australia, South Australia)
 C. exquisitum Baehr & Jocqué, 2000 — Australia (South Australia, Queensland)
 C. guttulatum Baehr & Jocqué, 2000 — Australia (South Australia)
 C. index Baehr & Jocqué, 2000 — Australia (Northern Territory)
 C. lacertae Baehr & Jocqué, 2000 — Australia (Northern Territory, South Australia, Queensland)
 C. margaretae Baehr & Jocqué, 2000 — Australia (Western Australia)
 C. martini Baehr & Jocqué, 2000 — Australia (Western Australia)
 C. mjoebergi Baehr & Jocqué, 2000 — Australia (Western Australia)
 C. tenuicalcar Baehr & Jocqué, 2000 — Australia (Western Australia)
 C. triunguis Baehr & Jocqué, 2000 — Australia (Queensland)

Chariobas

Chariobas Simon, 1893 - Storenomorphinae
 C. armatissimus Caporiacco, 1947 — Ethiopia
 C. cylindraceus Simon, 1893 (type) — Ivory Coast, Gabon, Congo, Angola
 C. lineatus Pocock, 1900 — South Africa
 C. mamillatus Strand, 1909 — South Africa
 C. navigator Strand, 1909 — South Africa

Chilumena

Chilumena Jocqué, 1995 - Storeninae
 C. baehrorum Jocqué, 1995 — Australia (Northern Territory)
 C. reprobans Jocqué, 1995 (type) — Australia (Western Australia)

Cicynethus

Cicynethus Simon, 1910 - (type)  Storenomorphinae
 C. acanthopus Simon, 1910 (type) — Namibia
 C. acer Jocqué & Henrard, 2018 — Mozambique, South Africa
 C. decoratus (Lawrence, 1952) — South Africa
 C. floriumfontis Jocqué, 1991 — South Africa
 C. mossambicus Jocqué & Henrard, 2018 — Mozambique
 C. peringueyi (Simon, 1893) — South Africa
 C. subtropicalis (Lawrence, 1952) — South Africa

Colima

Colima Jocqué & Baert, 2005 - Incertae Sedis
 C. colima Jocqué & Baert, 2005 (type) — Mexico
 C. manzanillo Jocqué & Baert, 2005 — Mexico

Cryptothele

Cryptothele L. Koch, 1872 - Cryptothelinae
 C. alluaudi Simon, 1893 — Seychelles
 C. ceylonica O. Pickard-Cambridge, 1877 — Sri Lanka
 C. collina Pocock, 1901 — India
 C. cristata Simon, 1884 — Mexico (probably false locality)
 C. doreyana Simon, 1890 — New Guinea, Australia (Queensland)
 C. marchei Simon, 1890 — New Caledonia, Mariana Is.
 C. sundaica Thorell, 1890 — Singapore, Indonesia (Sumatra, Java)
 C. s. amplior Kulczyński, 1911 — Indonesia (Sunda Is.)
 C. s. javana Kulczyński, 1911 — Indonesia (Java)
 C. verrucosa L. Koch, 1872 (type) — Samoa, Fiji

Cybaeodamus

Cybaeodamus Mello-Leitão, 1938 - Storeninae
 C. brescoviti Lise, Ott & Rodrigues, 2009 — Brazil
 C. enigmaticus (Mello-Leitão, 1939) — Argentina
 C. lentiginosus (Simon, 1905) — Argentina
 C. lycosoides (Nicolet, 1849) — Peru, Chile
 C. meridionalis Lise, Ott & Rodrigues, 2009 — Brazil, Paraguay, Argentina
 C. ornatus Mello-Leitão, 1938 (type) — Peru, Argentina, Uruguay
 C. taim Lise, Ott & Rodrigues, 2009 — Brazil, Argentina
 C. tocantins Lise, Ott & Rodrigues, 2009 — Brazil

Cydrela

Cydrela Thorell, 1873 - Cydrelinae
 C. albopilosa Simon & Fage, 1922 — East Africa
 C. decidua Dankittipakul & Jocqué, 2006 — Thailand
 C. escheri (Reimoser, 1934) — India
 C. friedlanderae Hewitt, 1914 — South Africa
 C. insularis (Pocock, 1899) — Yemen (Socotra)
 C. kenti Lessert, 1933 — Angola
 C. linzhiensis (Hu, 2001) — China
 C. nasuta Lessert, 1936 — Mozambique
 C. nitidiceps (Simon, 1905) — India
 C. otavensis Lawrence, 1928 — Namibia
 C. pristina Dankittipakul & Jocqué, 2006 — Thailand
 C. schoemanae Jocqué, 1991 — South Africa
 C. spinifrons Hewitt, 1915 — South Africa
 C. spinimana Pocock, 1898 — South Africa
 C. stigmatica (Simon, 1876) — Tanzania (Zanzibar)
 C. stillata (Simon, 1905) — India
 C. unguiculata (O. Pickard-Cambridge, 1871) (type) — South Africa

Cyrioctea

Cyrioctea Simon, 1889 - Cyriocteninae
 C. aschaensis Schiapelli & Gerschman, 1942 — Argentina
 C. calderoni Platnick, 1986 — Chile
 C. cruz Platnick, 1986 — Chile
 C. griswoldorum Platnick & Jocqué, 1992 — Namibia
 C. hirsuta Platnick & Griffin, 1988 — Namibia
 C. islachanaral Grismado & Pizarro-Araya, 2016 — Chile
 C. lotzi Jocqué, 2013 — South Africa
 C. marken Platnick & Jocqué, 1992 — South Africa
 C. mauryi Platnick, 1986 — Chile
 C. namibensis Platnick & Griffin, 1988 — Namibia
 C. raveni Platnick & Griffin, 1988 — Australia (Queensland)
 C. sawadee Jocqué, 2013 — South Africa
 C. spinifera (Nicolet, 1849) (type) — Chile
 C. whartoni Platnick & Griffin, 1988 — Namibia

D-H

Diores

Diores Simon, 1893 - Zodariinae
 D. annetteae Jocqué, 1990 — South Africa
 D. anomalus Jocqué, 1990 — Madagascar
 D. auricula Tucker, 1920 — Zimbabwe, South Africa
 D. bifurcatus Tucker, 1920 — South Africa
 D. bivattatus Simon, 1893 (type) — South Africa
 D. bouilloni Benoit, 1965 — Congo
 D. brevis Jocqué, 1990 — Kenya
 D. capensis Tucker, 1920 — South Africa
 D. chelinda Jocqué, 1990 — Malawi
 D. cognatus O. Pickard-Cambridge, 1904 — South Africa
 D. damara Jocqué, 1990 — Namibia
 D. decipiens Jocqué, 1990 — South Africa
 D. delesserti Caporiacco, 1949 — Kenya
 D. delicatulus Lawrence, 1936 — Botswana, Zimbabwe
 D. dowsetti Jocqué, 1990 — South Africa
 D. druryi Tucker, 1920 — Namibia
 D. femoralis Jocqué, 1990 — South Africa
 D. filomenae Jocqué, 2003 — Comoros, Mayotte
 D. geraerti Jocqué, 1990 — Cameroon, Congo
 D. godfreyi Hewitt, 1919 — South Africa
 D. griswoldorum Jocqué, 1990 — Namibia
 D. immaculatus Tullgren, 1910 — Tanzania
 D. initialis Jocqué, 1990 — Kenya, Tanzania
 D. jonesi Tucker, 1920 — South Africa
 D. kenyae Berland, 1920 — Kenya
 D. kibonotensis Tullgren, 1910 — Tanzania
 D. leleupi Jocqué, 1990 — South Africa
 D. lemaireae Jocqué, 1990 — Malawi
 D. lesserti Lawrence, 1952 — South Africa, Lesotho
 D. magicus Jocqué & Dippenaar-Schoeman, 1992 — Zimbabwe
 D. malaissei Jocqué, 1990 — Congo
 D. milloti Jocqué, 1990 — Madagascar
 D. miombo Jocqué, 1990 — Malawi
 D. monospinus Jocqué, 1990 — Malawi
 D. murphyorum Jocqué, 1990 — Kenya, Tanzania
 D. naivashae Berland, 1920 — Kenya
 D. namibia Jocqué, 1990 — Namibia
 D. patellaris Jocqué, 1990 — Malawi
 D. pauper Jocqué, 1990 — South Africa
 D. poweri Tucker, 1920 — South Africa, Lesotho
 D. radulifer Simon, 1910 — Botswana, South Africa
 D. rectus Jocqué, 1990 — Malawi, South Africa
 D. recurvatus Jocqué, 1990 — South Africa
 D. russelli Jocqué, 1990 — Botswana
 D. salisburyensis Tucker, 1920 — Namibia, Botswana, Zimbabwe, Zambia
 D. seiugatus Jocqué, 1986 — Comoros
 D. sequax Jocqué, 1990 — South Africa
 D. setosus Tucker, 1920 — South Africa
 D. silvestris Jocqué, 1990 — South Africa
 D. similis Russell-Smith & Jocqué, 2015 — Tanzania
 D. simoni O. Pickard-Cambridge, 1904 — South Africa
 D. simplicior Jocqué, 1990 — Malawi
 D. spinulosus Jocqué, 1990 — South Africa
 D. strandi Caporiacco, 1949 — Kenya, Rwanda, Congo
 D. tavetae Berland, 1920 — Kenya
 D. termitophagus Jocqué & Dippenaar-Schoeman, 1992 — South Africa
 D. triangulifer Simon, 1910 — Namibia, South Africa
 D. triarmatus Lessert, 1929 — Congo
 D. univittatus Tullgren, 1910 — Tanzania
 D. youngai Jocqué, 1990 — South Africa

Dusmadiores

Dusmadiores Jocqué, 1987 - Zodariinae
 D. deserticola Jocqué, 2011 — Cape Verde
 D. doubeni Jocqué, 1987 — Togo
 D. elgonensis Vanderhaegen & Jocqué, 2017 — Uganda
 D. katelijnae Jocqué, 1987 (type) — Nigeria
 D. laminatus Russell-Smith & Jocqué, 2015 — Tanzania
 D. orientalis Jocqué & van Harten, 2015 — Yemen
 D. robanja Jocqué, 1987 — Ivory Coast

† Eocydrele

Eocydrele Petrunkevitch, 1958 - Cydrelinae
 † E. mortua Petrunkevitch, 1958 (type) — Palaeogene Baltic amber

Epicratinus

Epicratinus Jocqué & Baert, 2005 - Incertae Sedis
 E. amazonicus Jocqué & Baert, 2005 (type) — Brazil
 E. anakin Gonçalves & Brescovit, 2020 — Brazil
 E. dookan Gonçalves & Brescovit, 2020 — Brazil
 E. ehonda Gonçalves & Brescovit, 2020 — Brazil
 E. mauru Gonçalves & Brescovit, 2020 — Brazil
 E. omegarugal Gonçalves & Brescovit, 2020 — Brazil
 E. pegasus Gonçalves & Brescovit, 2020 — Brazil
 E. perfidus (Jocqué & Baert, 2002) — Bolivia, Brazil
 E. petropolitanus (Mello-Leitão, 1922) — Brazil
 E. pikachu Gonçalves & Brescovit, 2020 — Brazil
 E. pugionifer Jocqué & Baert, 2005 — Brazil
 E. stitch Gonçalves & Brescovit, 2020 — Brazil
 E. takutu Jocqué & Baert, 2005 — Guyana, Brazil
 E. vader Gonçalves & Brescovit, 2020 — Brazil
 E. zangief Gonçalves & Brescovit, 2020 — Brazil
 E. zelda Gonçalves & Brescovit, 2020 — Brazil

Euasteron

Euasteron Baehr, 2003 - Storninae
 E. atriceps Baehr, 2003 — Australia (Western Australia)
 E. bartoni Baehr, 2003 — Australia (Victoria)
 E. carnarvon Baehr, 2003 — Australia (Western Australia)
 E. churchillae Baehr, 2003 — Australia (Northern Territory)
 E. enterprise Baehr, 2003 (type) — Australia (Queensland)
 E. gibsonae Baehr, 2003 — Australia (Northern Territory, Queensland)
 E. harveyi Baehr, 2003 — Australia (Western Australia)
 E. johannae Baehr, 2003 — Australia (Western Australia)
 E. juliannae Baehr, 2003 — Australia (Western Australia)
 E. krebsorum Baehr, 2003 — Australia (New South Wales, South Australia)
 E. lorne Baehr, 2003 — Australia (New South Wales)
 E. milledgei Baehr, 2003 — Australia (New South Wales)
 E. monteithorum Baehr, 2003 — Australia (Queensland, New South Wales)
 E. raveni Baehr, 2003 — Australia (Queensland)
 E. ulrichi Baehr, 2003 — Australia (Western Australia)
 E. ursulae Baehr, 2003 — Australia (Western Australia)
 E. willeroo Baehr, 2003 — Australia (Northern Territory)

Euryeidon

Euryeidon Dankittipakul & Jocqué, 2004 - Zodariinae
 E. anthonyi Dankittipakul & Jocqué, 2004 — Thailand
 E. consideratum Dankittipakul & Jocqué, 2004 — Thailand
 E. jatashankarae Talwar, Majagi, Bodkhe & Kamble, 2018 — India
 E. katapagai Talwar, Majagi, Bodkhe & Kamble, 2018 — India
 E. monticola Dankittipakul & Jocqué, 2004 (type) — Thailand
 E. musicum Dankittipakul & Jocqué, 2004 — Thailand
 E. schwendingeri Dankittipakul & Jocqué, 2004 — Thailand
 E. sonthichaiae Dankittipakul & Jocqué, 2004 — Thailand

Forsterella

Forsterella Jocqué, 1991 - Storeninae
 F. faceta Jocqué, 1991 (type) — New Zealand

Habronestes

Habronestes L. Koch, 1872 - Storeninae
 H. archiei Baehr, 2008 — Australia (Queensland)
 H. australiensis (O. Pickard-Cambridge, 1869) — Australia
 H. bicornis Baehr, 2003 — Australia (New South Wales)
 H. bispinosus Baehr & Raven, 2009 — Australia (Tasmania)
 H. boq Baehr, 2008 — Australia (Queensland)
 H. boutinae Baehr & Raven, 2009 — Australia (Tasmania)
 H. bradleyi (O. Pickard-Cambridge, 1869) — Australia
 H. braemar Baehr, 2008 — Australia (Queensland)
 H. calamitosus Jocqué, 1995 — Australia (Queensland)
 H. clausoni Baehr, 2008 — Australia (Queensland)
 H. dickmani Baehr, 2008 — Australia (Queensland)
 H. diocesegrafton Baehr, 2008 — Australia (New South Wales)
 H. driesseni Baehr & Raven, 2009 — Australia (Tasmania)
 H. driscolli Baehr, 2003 — Australia (New South Wales)
 H. drummond Baehr, 2008 — Australia (Queensland)
 H. epping Baehr & Raven, 2009 — Australia (Tasmania)
 H. gallowayi Baehr, 2008 — Australia (Queensland)
 H. gayndah Baehr, 2008 — Australia (Queensland)
 H. giganteus Baehr, 2003 — Australia (New South Wales)
 H. grahami Baehr, 2003 — Australia (New South Wales, Australian Capital Territory)
 H. grayi Baehr, 2003 — Australia (New South Wales)
 H. grimwadei (Dunn, 1951) — Australia
 H. gumbardo Baehr, 2008 — Australia (Queensland)
 H. hamatus Baehr, 2003 — Australia (New South Wales)
 H. hebronae Baehr, 2003 — Australia (Queensland, New South Wales)
 H. helenae Baehr, 2003 — Australia (New South Wales)
 H. hickmani Baehr & Raven, 2009 — Australia (Tasmania)
 H. hooperi Baehr, 2008 — Australia (Queensland)
 H. hunti Baehr, 2003 — Australia (New South Wales)
 H. jankae Baehr, 2008 — Australia (Queensland, New South Wales)
 H. jocquei Baehr, 2003 — Australia (New South Wales)
 H. longiconductor Baehr, 2003 — Australia (New South Wales)
 H. macedonensis (Hogg, 1900) — Australia (New South Wales, Victoria, Tasmania)
 H. minor Baehr, 2003 — Australia (New South Wales)
 H. monocornis Baehr, 2003 — Australia (New South Wales)
 H. piccolo Baehr, 2003 — Australia (New South Wales)
 H. pictus (L. Koch, 1865) — Australia (New South Wales, Australian Capital Territory)
 H. powelli Baehr, 2008 — Australia (New South Wales)
 H. pseudoaustraliensis Baehr, 2003 — Australia (New South Wales)
 H. raveni Baehr, 2003 — Australia (New South Wales, Victoria)
 H. rawlinsonae Baehr, 2003 — Australia (Queensland, New South Wales)
 H. striatipes L. Koch, 1872 (type) — Australia (Queensland)
 H. tasmaniensis Baehr & Raven, 2009 — Australia (Tasmania)
 H. thaleri Baehr & Raven, 2009 — Australia (Tasmania)
 H. tillmani Baehr, 2008 — Australia (Queensland, New South Wales)
 H. toddi (Hickman, 1944) — Australia (Northern Territory)
 H. ulrichi Baehr, 2008 — Australia (New South Wales)
 H. ungari Baehr, 2003 — Australia (Queensland, New South Wales)
 H. weelahensis Baehr, 2003 — Australia (Queensland, New South Wales)
 H. wilkiei Baehr, 2003 — Australia (New South Wales)

Heliconilla

Heliconilla Dankittipakul, Jocqué & Singtripop, 2012 - Incertae Sedis
 H. aculeata Dankittipakul, Jocqué & Singtripop, 2012 — Thailand
 H. cochleata Dankittipakul, Jocqué & Singtripop, 2012 — Vietnam
 H. crassa Dankittipakul, Jocqué & Singtripop, 2012 — Thailand
 H. furcata Dankittipakul, Jocqué & Singtripop, 2012 — Thailand
 H. globularis Dankittipakul, Jocqué & Singtripop, 2012 — Thailand, Malaysia, Singapore
 H. irrorata (Thorell, 1887) — Myanmar
 H. mesopetala Dankittipakul, Jocqué & Singtripop, 2012 — Myanmar, Thailand
 H. oblonga (Zhang & Zhu, 2009) — China, Thailand
 H. thaleri (Dankittipakul & Schwendinger, 2009) (type) — Thailand

Heradida

Heradida Simon, 1893 - Zodariinae
 H. bicincta Simon, 1910 — South Africa
 H. extima Jocqué, 1987 — South Africa
 H. griffinae Jocqué, 1987 — Namibia
 H. loricata Simon, 1893 (type) — South Africa
 H. minutissima Russell-Smith & Jocqué, 2015 — Tanzania
 H. quadrimaculata Pavesi, 1895 — Ethiopia
 H. speculigera Jocqué, 1987 — South Africa
 H. xerampelina Benoit, 1974 — South Africa

Heradion

Heradion Dankittipakul & Jocqué, 2004 - Zodarinae
 H. damrongi Dankittipakul & Jocqué, 2004 — Malaysia
 H. depressum Dankittipakul, Jäger & Singtripop, 2012 — Laos
 H. flammeum (Ono, 2004) — Vietnam
 H. intermedium Chami-Kranon & Ono, 2007 — Vietnam
 H. luctator Dankittipakul & Jocqué, 2004 — Malaysia
 H. momoinum (Ono, 2004) — Vietnam
 H. naiadis Dankittipakul & Jocqué, 2004 (type) — Thailand
 H. paradiseum (Ono, 2004) — China, Vietnam
 H. pernix Dankittipakul & Jocqué, 2004 — Malaysia
 H. peteri Dankittipakul & Jocqué, 2004 — Thailand

Hermippus

Hermippus Simon, 1893 - Storeninae
 H. affinis Strand, 1906 — Ethiopia, Somalia
 H. arcus Jocqué, 1989 — Tanzania
 H. arjuna (Gravely, 1921) — India
 H. cruciatus Simon, 1905 — India, Sri Lanka
 H. gavi Sankaran, Jobi, Joseph & Sebastian, 2014 — India
 H. globosus Sankaran, Jobi, Joseph & Sebastian, 2014 — India
 H. inflexus Sankaran, Jobi, Joseph & Sebastian, 2014 — India
 H. loricatus Simon, 1893 (type) — Central, Southern Africa
 H. minutus Jocqué, 1986 — Zimbabwe
 H. schoutedeni Lessert, 1938 — Kenya
 H. septemguttatus Lawrence, 1942 — South Africa
 H. tenebrosus Jocqué, 1986 — South Africa

Hetaerica

Hetaerica Rainbow, 1916 - Storeninae
 H. harveyi Raven & Baehr, 2000 — Australia (Western Australia)
 H. scenica (L. Koch, 1872) (type) — Australia (Queensland)

Holasteron

Holasteron Baehr, 2004 - Storeninae
 H. aciculare Baehr, 2004 (type) — Australia
 H. aspinosum Baehr, 2004 — Australia (Western Australia)
 H. driscolli Baehr, 2004 — Australia (New South Wales, South Australia)
 H. esperance Baehr, 2004 — Australia (Western Australia)
 H. flinders Baehr, 2004 — Australia (South Australia)
 H. hirsti Baehr, 2004 — Australia (South Australia)
 H. humphreysi Baehr, 2004 — Australia (South Australia)
 H. kangaroo Baehr, 2004 — Australia (South Australia)
 H. marliesae Baehr, 2004 — Australia (New South Wales)
 H. perth Baehr, 2004 — Australia (Western Australia)
 H. pusillum Baehr, 2004 — Australia (Western Australia, South Australia)
 H. quemuseum Baehr, 2004 — Australia (Queensland)
 H. reinholdae Baehr, 2004 — Australia (Western Australia)
 H. spinosum Baehr, 2004 — Australia (Western Australia, South Australia, Victoria)
 H. stirling Baehr, 2004 — Australia (Western Australia)
 H. wamuseum Baehr, 2004 — Australia (Western Australia)

I-M

Ishania

Ishania Chamberlin, 1925 - Storeninae
 I. absoluta (Gertsch & Davis, 1940) — Mexico
 I. aztek Jocqué & Baert, 2002 — Mexico
 I. centrocavata Jocqué & Baert, 2002 — Mexico
 I. chicanna Jocqué & Baert, 2002 — Mexico
 I. chichimek Jocqué & Baert, 2002 — Mexico
 I. firma Jocqué & Baert, 2002 — Mexico
 I. gertschi Jocqué & Baert, 2002 — Mexico
 I. guerrero Jocqué & Baert, 2002 — Mexico
 I. hessei (Chamberlin & Ivie, 1936) — Mexico
 I. huastek Jocqué & Baert, 2002 — Mexico
 I. ivieorum Jocqué & Baert, 2002 — Mexico
 I. latefossulata Jocqué & Baert, 2002 — Mexico
 I. maya Jocqué & Baert, 2002 — Mexico
 I. minuta Jocqué & Baert, 2002 — Honduras
 I. mixtek Jocqué & Baert, 2002 — Mexico
 I. mundella (Gertsch & Davis, 1940) — Mexico
 I. nayarit Jocqué & Baert, 2002 — Mexico
 I. oaxaca Jocqué & Baert, 2002 — Mexico
 I. ocosingo Jocqué & Baert, 2002 — Mexico
 I. olmek Jocqué & Baert, 2002 — Mexico
 I. paxoides Jocqué & Baert, 2002 — Mexico, Honduras
 I. perforata Jocqué & Baert, 2002 — Guatemala
 I. protecta Jocqué & Baert, 2002 — Mexico
 I. querci Jocqué & Baert, 2002 — Mexico
 I. real Jocqué & Baert, 2002 — Mexico
 I. relativa Jocqué & Baert, 2002 — Mexico
 I. simplex Jocqué & Baert, 2002 — Mexico
 I. tarask Jocqué & Baert, 2002 — Mexico
 I. tentativa Chamberlin, 1925 (type) — Costa Rica
 I. tinga (F. O. Pickard-Cambridge, 1899) — Mexico
 I. tormento Jocqué & Baert, 2002 — Mexico
 I. totonak Jocqué & Baert, 2002 — Mexico
 I. vacua Jocqué & Baert, 2002 — Mexico
 I. xilitla Jocqué & Baert, 2002 — Mexico
 I. zapotek Jocqué & Baert, 2002 — Mexico

Lachesana

Lachesana Strand, 1932 - Lachesaninae
 L. bayramgocmeni Özkütük, Yağmur, Gücel, Shafaie, Özden & Kunt, 2020 — Cyprus
 L. blackwalli (O. Pickard-Cambridge, 1872) — Greece, Cyprus, Turkey, Israel, Lebanon
 L. dyachkovi Fomichev & Marusik, 2019 — Kazakhstan
 L. graeca Thaler & Knoflach, 2004 — Greece
 L. insensibilis Jocqué, 1991 — Israel, Saudi Arabia, Iran
 L. kavirensis Zamani & Marusik, 2021 — Iran
 L. naxos Wunderlich, 2022 — Greece
 L. perseus Zamani & Marusik, 2021 — Iran
 L. perversa (Audouin, 1826) (type) — Egypt, Syria
 L. rufiventris (Simon, 1873) — Israel, Syria
 L. tarabaevi Zonstein & Ovtchinnikov, 1999 — Kyrgyzstan, Uzbekistan, Tajikistan

Laminion

Laminion Sankaran, Caleb & Sebastian, 2020
 L. arakuense (Patel & Reddy, 1989) — India
 L. birenifer (Gravely, 1921) (type) — India
 L. debasrae (Biswas & Biswas, 1992) — India
 L. gujaratense (Tikader & Patel, 1975) — India

Leprolochus

Leprolochus Simon, 1893 - Incertae Sedis
 L. birabeni Mello-Leitão, 1942 — Brazil, Paraguay, Argentina
 L. levergere Lise, 1994 — Brazil
 L. mucuge Lise, 1994 — Brazil
 L. oeiras Lise, 1994 — Brazil
 L. parahybae Mello-Leitão, 1917 — Brazil
 L. spinifrons Simon, 1893 (type) — Panama to Venezuela
 L. stratus Jocqué & Platnick, 1990 — Venezuela

Leptasteron

Leptasteron Baehr & Jocqué, 2001 - Storeninae
 L. platyconductor Baehr & Jocqué, 2001 (type) — Australia (Western Australia)
 L. vexillum Baehr & Jocqué, 2001 — Australia (New South Wales)

Leviola

Leviola Miller, 1970 - Incertae Sedis
 L. termitophila Miller, 1970 (type) — Angola

Lutica

Lutica Marx, 1891 - Lachesaninae
 L. abalonea Gertsch, 1961 — USA
 L. clementea Gertsch, 1961 — USA
 L. maculata Marx, 1891 (type) — USA
 L. nicolasia Gertsch, 1961 — USA

Malayozodarion

Malayozodarion Ono & Hashim, 2008 - Incertae Sedis
 M. hoiseni Ono & Hashim, 2008 (type) — Malaysia

Mallinella

Mallinella Strand, 1906 - Storeninae
Mallinella abdita Dankittipakul, Jocqué & Singtripop, 2010 – Borneo
Mallinella abnormis Dankittipakul, Jocqué & Singtripop, 2012 – Malaysia
Mallinella acanthoclada Dankittipakul, Jocqué & Singtripop, 2012 – Thailand
Mallinella acroscopica Dankittipakul, Jocqué & Singtripop, 2012 – Java
Mallinella adonis Dankittipakul, Jocqué & Singtripop, 2012 – Malaysia
Mallinella advena Dankittipakul, Jocqué & Singtripop, 2012 – Thailand
Mallinella albomaculata (Bosmans & Hillyard, 1990) – Borneo, Sulawesi
Mallinella albotibialis (Bosmans & van Hove, 1986) – Cameroon
Mallinella allantoides Dankittipakul, Jocqué & Singtripop, 2012 – Thailand
Mallinella allorostrata Dankittipakul, Jocqué & Singtripop, 2012 – Malaysia, Singapore
Mallinella alonalon Lualhati-Caurez & Barrion, 2020 – Philippines (Luzon)
Mallinella alticola Dankittipakul, Jocqué & Singtripop, 2012 – Thailand
Mallinella amblyrhyncha Dankittipakul, Jocqué & Singtripop, 2012 – Malaysia
Mallinella ampliata Dankittipakul, Jocqué & Singtripop, 2012 – Vietnam
Mallinella angoonae Dankittipakul, Jocqué & Singtripop, 2012 – Malaysia
Mallinella angulosa Dankittipakul, Jocqué & Singtripop, 2012 – Malaysia
Mallinella angustata Dankittipakul, Jocqué & Singtripop, 2012 – Borneo
Mallinella angustissima Dankittipakul, Jocqué & Singtripop, 2012 – Malaysia
Mallinella annulipes (Thorell, 1892) – Malaysia, Singapore, Indonesia
Mallinella apiculata Dankittipakul, Jocqué & Singtripop, 2012 – Malaysia
Mallinella apodysocrina Dankittipakul, Jocqué & Singtripop, 2012 – New Guinea
Mallinella atromarginata Dankittipakul, Jocqué & Singtripop, 2012 – Thailand
Mallinella axillocrina Dankittipakul, Jocqué & Singtripop, 2012 – Solomon Is.
Mallinella bandamaensis (Jézéquel, 1964) – Ivory Coast
Mallinella beauforti (Kulczyński, 1911) – New Guinea
Mallinella belladonna Dankittipakul, Jocqué & Singtripop, 2012 – Sumatra
Mallinella bicanaliculata (B. S. Zhang & F. Zhang, 2019) – Malaysia (Borneo)
Mallinella bicolor (Jézéquel, 1964) – Ivory Coast
Mallinella bidenticulata Dankittipakul, Jocqué & Singtripop, 2012 – Thailand
Mallinella bifida Dankittipakul, Jocqué & Singtripop, 2010 – Borneo
Mallinella bifurcata Wang et al., 2009 – China
Mallinella bigemina Dankittipakul, Jocqué & Singtripop, 2012 – Borneo
Mallinella birostrata Dankittipakul, Jocqué & Singtripop, 2012 – Borneo
Mallinella biumbonalia Wang et al., 2009 – China
Mallinella bosmansi Nzigidahera, Desnyder & Jocqué, 2011 – Cameroon
Mallinella brachiata Dankittipakul, Jocqué & Singtripop, 2012 – Thailand
Mallinella brachyrhyncha Dankittipakul, Jocqué & Singtripop, 2012 – Malaysia
Mallinella brachytheca Dankittipakul, Jocqué & Singtripop, 2012 – Borneo
Mallinella brunneofusca Dankittipakul, Jocqué & Singtripop, 2012 – Thailand
Mallinella calautica (B. S. Zhang & F. Zhang, 2019) – Malaysia (Borneo)
Mallinella calicoanensis Dankittipakul, Jocqué & Singtripop, 2012 – Philippines
Mallinella calilungae (Barrion & Litsinger, 1992) – Philippines
Mallinella callicera Dankittipakul, Jocqué & Singtripop, 2012 – Thailand
Mallinella cameroonensis (van Hove & Bosmans, 1984) – Cameroon
Mallinella caperata Dankittipakul, Jocqué & Singtripop, 2012 – Sumatra
Mallinella capitulata Dankittipakul, Jocqué & Singtripop, 2012 – Thailand
Mallinella chengjiaani (Barrion, Barrion-Dupo & Heong, 2013) – China (Hainan)
Mallinella cirrifera Dankittipakul, Jocqué & Singtripop, 2012 – Sumatra
Mallinella clavigera Dankittipakul, Jocqué & Singtripop, 2012 – Sumatra
Mallinella comitata Dankittipakul, Jocqué & Singtripop, 2012 – Borneo
Mallinella concava Dankittipakul, Jocqué & Singtripop, 2012 – Sumatra
Mallinella consona Logunov, 2010 – Vietnam
Mallinella convolutiva Dankittipakul, Jocqué & Singtripop, 2012 – Vietnam
Mallinella cordiformis Dankittipakul, Jocqué & Singtripop, 2012 – Sumatra
Mallinella cryptocera Dankittipakul, Jocqué & Singtripop, 2012 – Thailand
Mallinella cryptomembrana Dankittipakul, Jocqué & Singtripop, 2012 – New Guinea
Mallinella cuspidata Dankittipakul, Jocqué & Singtripop, 2012 – Sumatra
Mallinella cuspidatissima Dankittipakul, Jocqué & Singtripop, 2012 – Sumatra
Mallinella cymbiforma Wang, Yin & Peng, 2009 – China
Mallinella dambrica Ono, 2004 – Vietnam
Mallinella debeiri (Bosmans & van Hove, 1986) – Cameroon
Mallinella decorata (Thorell, 1895) – Myanmar
Mallinella decurtata (Thorell, 1899) – Cameroon
Mallinella denticulata Dankittipakul, Jocqué & Singtripop, 2012 – Malaysia
Mallinella dibangensis (Biswas & Biswas, 2006) – India
Mallinella digitata Zhang, Zhang & Chen, 2011 – China
Mallinella dinghu Song & Kim, 1997 – China
Mallinella dolichobilobata Dankittipakul, Jocqué & Singtripop, 2012 – Malaysia
Mallinella dolichorhyncha Dankittipakul, Jocqué & Singtripop, 2012 – Malaysia
Mallinella dumogabonensis (Bosmans & Hillyard, 1990) – Sulawesi
Mallinella elegans Dankittipakul, Jocqué & Singtripop, 2012 – Malaysia
Mallinella elongata Dankittipakul, Jocqué & Singtripop, 2012 – Malaysia
Mallinella erratica (Ono, 1983) – Nepal
Mallinella etindei (van Hove & Bosmans, 1984) – Cameroon
Mallinella exornata (Thorell, 1887) – Myanmar
Mallinella fasciata (Kulczyński, 1911) – Malaysia, Java, Bali
Mallinella filicata Dankittipakul, Jocqué & Singtripop, 2012 – Thailand
Mallinella filifera Dankittipakul, Jocqué & Singtripop, 2012 – Sumatra
Mallinella flabellata Dankittipakul, Jocqué & Singtripop, 2012 – Borneo
Mallinella flabelliformis Dankittipakul, Jocqué & Singtripop, 2012 – Malaysia
Mallinella flagelliformis Dankittipakul, Jocqué & Singtripop, 2012 – Borneo
Mallinella fronto (Thorell, 1887) – Myanmar
Mallinella fulvipes (Ono & Tanikawa, 1990) – Ryukyu Is.
Mallinella galyaniae Dankittipakul, Jocqué & Singtripop, 2012 – Thailand
Mallinella glomerata Dankittipakul, Jocqué & Singtripop, 2012 – Thailand
Mallinella gombakensis Ono & Hashim, 2008 – Malaysia
Mallinella gongi Bao & Yin, 2002 – China
Mallinella hainan Song & Kim, 1997 – China
Mallinella hamata (Bosmans & Hillyard, 1990) – Sulawesi
Mallinella hilaris (Thorell, 1890) – Java
Mallinella hingstoni (Brignoli, 1982) – China
Mallinella hoangliena Logunov, 2010 – Vietnam
Mallinella hoosi (Kishida, 1935) – Japan
Mallinella immaculata Zhang & Zhu, 2009 – China, Thailand
Mallinella inflata (Bosmans & van Hove, 1986) – Cameroon
Mallinella innovata Dankittipakul, Jocqué & Singtripop, 2012 – Thailand
Mallinella insolita Dankittipakul, Jocqué & Singtripop, 2012 – Thailand
Mallinella insulana Dankittipakul, Jocqué & Singtripop, 2010 – Bali
Mallinella jaegeri Dankittipakul, Jocqué & Singtripop, 2012 – Malaysia
Mallinella karubei Ono, 2003 – Vietnam
Mallinella kelvini (Bosmans & Hillyard, 1990) – Sulawesi
Mallinella khanhoa Logunov, 2010 – Vietnam
Mallinella kibonotensis (Bosmans & van Hove, 1986) – Kenya, Tanzania
Mallinella klossi (Hogg, 1922) – Vietnam
Mallinella koupensis (Bosmans & van Hove, 1986) – Cameroon
Mallinella kritscheri Dankittipakul, Jocqué & Singtripop, 2012 – Sumatra
Mallinella kunmingensis Wang et al., 2009 – China
Mallinella labialis Song & Kim, 1997 – China
Mallinella langping Zhang & Zhu, 2009 – China
Mallinella laxa (B. S. Zhang & F. Zhang, 2019) – Malaysia (Borneo)
Mallinella leonardi (Simon, 1907) – Príncipe
Mallinella leptoclada Dankittipakul, Jocqué & Singtripop, 2012 – Malaysia
Mallinella linguiformis Dankittipakul, Jocqué & Singtripop, 2012 – Thailand
Mallinella liuyang Yin & Yan, 2001 – China
Mallinella lobata (Bosmans & Hillyard, 1990) – Sulawesi
Mallinella longipoda Dankittipakul, Jocqué & Singtripop, 2012 – Borneo
Mallinella maculata Strand, 1906 (type species) – Ethiopia
Mallinella manengoubensis (Bosmans & van Hove, 1986) – Cameroon
Mallinella maolanensis Wang, Ran & Chen, 1999 – China
Mallinella martensi (Ono, 1983) – Nepal
Mallinella maruyamai Ono & Hashim, 2008 – Malaysia
Mallinella mbaboensis (Bosmans & van Hove, 1986) – Cameroon
Mallinella mbamensis (Bosmans & van Hove, 1986) – Cameroon
Mallinella melanognatha (Hasselt, 1882) – Sumatra
Mallinella meriani (Bosmans & Hillyard, 1990) – Sulawesi
Mallinella merimbunenis Koh & Dankittipakul, 2014 – Borneo
Mallinella microcera Dankittipakul, Jocqué & Singtripop, 2012 – Vietnam
Mallinella microleuca Dankittipakul, Jocqué & Singtripop, 2012 – Malaysia
Mallinella microtheca Dankittipakul, Jocqué & Singtripop, 2012 – Malaysia
Mallinella montana Dankittipakul, Jocqué & Singtripop, 2012 – Thailand
Mallinella monticola (van Hove & Bosmans, 1984) – Cameroon
Mallinella mucocrina Dankittipakul, Jocqué & Singtripop, 2012 – Solomon Is.
Mallinella multicornis Dankittipakul, Jocqué & Singtripop, 2012 – Malaysia
Mallinella murphyorum Dankittipakul, Jocqué & Singtripop, 2012 – Malaysia
Mallinella myrmecophaga Koh & Dankittipakul, 2014 – Borneo
Mallinella nepalensis (Ono, 1983) – Nepal
Mallinella ngoclinha Logunov, 2010 – Vietnam
Mallinella nigra (Bosmans & Hillyard, 1990) – Sulawesi
Mallinella nilgherina (Simon, 1906) – India
Mallinella nomurai Ono, 2003 – Vietnam
Mallinella nyikae (Pocock, 1898) – Malawi
Mallinella obliqua (B. S. Zhang & F. Zhang, 2019) – Malaysia (Borneo)
Mallinella obtusa Zhang, Zhang & Chen, 2011 – China
Mallinella octosignata (Simon, 1903) – Bioko
Mallinella oculobella Dankittipakul, Jocqué & Singtripop, 2012 – Thailand
Mallinella okinawaensis Tanikawa, 2005 – Japan
Mallinella okuensis (Bosmans & van Hove, 1986) – Cameroon
Mallinella onoi Dankittipakul, Jocqué & Singtripop, 2012 – Sumatra
Mallinella oscari Dankittipakul, Jocqué & Singtripop, 2012 – Thailand
Mallinella panchoi (Barrion & Litsinger, 1992) – Philippines
Mallinella pantianensis (Zhong, Chen & Liu, 2022) – China
Mallinella parabifurcata (Zhong, Chen & Liu, 2022) – China
Mallinella pectinata Dankittipakul, Jocqué & Singtripop, 2012 – Malaysia, Borneo, Bintan Is.
Mallinella peculiaris Dankittipakul, Jocqué & Singtripop, 2012 – Thailand
Mallinella phansipana Logunov, 2010 – Vietnam
Mallinella platycera Dankittipakul, Jocqué & Singtripop, 2012 – Thailand
Mallinella platyrhyncha Koh & Dankittipakul, 2014 – Borneo
Mallinella pluma Jin & Zhang, 2013 – China
Mallinella ponikii (Bosmans & Hillyard, 1990) – Sulawesi
Mallinella ponikioides (Bosmans & Hillyard, 1990) – Sulawesi
Mallinella preoboscidea Dankittipakul, Jocqué & Singtripop, 2012 – New Guinea
Mallinella pricei (Barrion & Litsinger, 1995) – Philippines
Mallinella pseudokunmingensis (Yu & Zhang, 2019) – China
Mallinella pulchra (Bosmans & Hillyard, 1990) – Sulawesi
Mallinella punctata Dankittipakul, Jocqué & Singtripop, 2012 – Borneo
Mallinella raniformis Dankittipakul, Jocqué & Singtripop, 2012 – Thailand
Mallinella rectangulata Zhang, Zhang & Chen, 2011 – China
Mallinella redimita (Simon, 1905) – India, Sri Lanka
Mallinella reinholdae Dankittipakul, Jocqué & Singtripop, 2012 – Sumatra
Mallinella renaria (B. S. Zhang & F. Zhang, 2018) – Laos
Mallinella robusta Dankittipakul, Jocqué & Singtripop, 2012 – Malaysia
Mallinella rolini Dankittipakul, Jocqué & Singtripop, 2012 – Malaysia
Mallinella rostrata Dankittipakul, Jocqué & Singtripop, 2012 – Thailand
Mallinella sadamotoi (Ono & Tanikawa, 1990) – Ryukyu Is.
Mallinella scapigera Dankittipakul, Jocqué & Singtripop, 2012 – Thailand
Mallinella scharffi Dankittipakul, Jocqué & Singtripop, 2012 – Borneo
Mallinella sciophana (Simon, 1901) – Malaysia, Sumatra
Mallinella selecta (Pavesi, 1895) – Ethiopia
Mallinella septemmaculata Ono, 2004 – Vietnam
Mallinella shimojanai (Ono & Tanikawa, 1990) – Ryukyu Is.
Mallinella shuqiangi Dankittipakul, Jocqué & Singtripop, 2012 – China
Mallinella silva Dankittipakul, Jocqué & Singtripop, 2012 – Thailand
Mallinella simillima Dankittipakul, Jocqué & Singtripop, 2012 – Malaysia
Mallinella simoni Dankittipakul, Jocqué & Singtripop, 2010 – Java, Belitung
Mallinella slaburuprica (Barrion & Litsinger, 1995) – Philippines
Mallinella sobria (Thorell, 1890) – Sumatra
Mallinella sphaerica Jin & Zhang, 2013 – China
Mallinella spiralis Dankittipakul, Jocqué & Singtripop, 2012 – Thailand
Mallinella stenotheca Dankittipakul, Jocqué & Singtripop, 2012 – Thailand
Mallinella suavis (Thorell, 1895) – Myanmar
Mallinella subinermis Caporiacco, 1947 – Tanzania
Mallinella submonticola (van Hove & Bosmans, 1984) – Cameroon, Príncipe
Mallinella sumatrana Dankittipakul, Jocqué & Singtripop, 2012 – Sumatra
Mallinella sundaica Dankittipakul, Jocqué & Singtripop, 2012 – Malaysia
Mallinella superba Dankittipakul, Jocqué & Singtripop, 2012 – Borneo
Mallinella sylvatica (van Hove & Bosmans, 1984) – Cameroon
Mallinella thailandica Dankittipakul, Jocqué & Singtripop, 2012 – Thailand
Mallinella thinhi Ono, 2003 – Vietnam
Mallinella tianlin Zhang, Zhang & Jia, 2012 – China
Mallinella tricuspidata Dankittipakul, Jocqué & Singtripop, 2012 – Malaysia
Mallinella tridentata (Bosmans & van Hove, 1986) – Cameroon
Mallinella triplex Nzigidahera, Desnyder & Jocqué, 2011 – Burundi
Mallinella tuberculata Dankittipakul, Jocqué & Singtripop, 2012 – Thailand
Mallinella tumidifemoris Ono & Hashim, 2008 – Malaysia
Mallinella uncinata (Ono, 1983) – Nepal
Mallinella v-insignita (Bosmans & Hillyard, 1990) – Sulawesi
Mallinella vandermarlierei (Bosmans & van Hove, 1986) – Cameroon
Mallinella vicaria (Kulczyński, 1911) – Java
Mallinella vietnamensis Ono, 2003 – Vietnam
Mallinella vittata (Thorell, 1890) – Sumatra
Mallinella vittiventris Strand, 1913 – Congo, Rwanda
Mallinella vokrensis (Bosmans & van Hove, 1986) – Cameroon
Mallinella vulparia Dankittipakul, Jocqué & Singtripop, 2012 – New Guinea
Mallinella vulpina Dankittipakul, Jocqué & Singtripop, 2012 – New Guinea
Mallinella wiputrai Dankittipakul, Jocqué & Singtripop, 2010 – Belitung
Mallinella zebra (Thorell, 1881) – Aru Is., New Guinea, Solomon Is., Queensland
Mallinella zhui Zhang, Zhang & Jia, 2012 – China

Mallinus

Mallinus Simon, 1893 - Zodariinae
 M. nitidiventris Simon, 1893 (type) — South Africa

Masasteron

Masasteron Baehr, 2004 - Storeninae
 M. barkly Baehr, 2004 — Australia (Northern Territory)
 M. bennieae Baehr, 2004 — Australia (Queensland)
 M. bipunctatum Baehr, 2004 — Australia (New South Wales)
 M. burbidgei Baehr, 2004 — Australia (Western Australia)
 M. clifton Baehr, 2004 — Australia (South Australia)
 M. complector Baehr, 2004 — Australia (Western Australia)
 M. darwin Baehr, 2004 — Australia (Northern Territory)
 M. derby Baehr, 2004 — Australia (Western Australia)
 M. deserticola Baehr, 2004 — Australia (South Australia)
 M. gracilis Baehr, 2004 — Australia (Western Australia)
 M. haroldi Baehr, 2004 — Australia (Western Australia)
 M. mackenziei Baehr, 2004 — Australia (Western Australia)
 M. maini Baehr, 2004 — Australia (Western Australia)
 M. mas (Jocqué, 1991) (type) — Australia
 M. ocellum Baehr, 2004 — Australia (Queensland)
 M. piankai Baehr, 2004 — Australia (Western Australia)
 M. queensland Baehr, 2004 — Australia (Queensland)
 M. sampeyae Baehr, 2004 — Australia (Western Australia)
 M. tealei Baehr, 2004 — Australia (Western Australia)
 M. tuart Baehr, 2004 — Australia (Western Australia)
 M. utae Baehr, 2004 — Australia (Northern Territory)

Mastidiores

Mastidiores Jocqué, 1987 - Zodariinae
 M. kora Jocqué, 1987 (type) — Kenya

Microdiores

Microdiores Jocqué, 1987 - Zodariinae
 M. aurantioviolaceus Nzigidahera & Jocqué, 2010 — Tanzania
 M. chowo Jocqué, 1987 (type) — Malawi
 M. rwegura Nzigidahera & Jocqué, 2010 — Burundi
 M. violaceus Nzigidahera & Jocqué, 2010 — Burundi

Minasteron

Minasteron Baehr & Jocqué, 2000 - Storeninae
 M. minusculum Baehr & Jocqué, 2000 — Australia (Western Australia)
 M. perfoliatum Baehr & Jocqué, 2000 — Australia (Western Australia, South Australia, Northern Territory)
 M. tangens Baehr & Jocqué, 2000 — Australia (Northern Territory, South Australia, Queensland)

N-P

Neostorena

Neostorena Rainbow, 1914 - Storeninae
 N. grayi Jocqué, 1991 — Australia (New South Wales)
 N. minor Jocqué, 1991 — Australia (Queensland, New South Wales)
 N. spirafera (L. Koch, 1872) — Australia (Queensland)
 N. torosa (Simon, 1908) — Australia (Western Australia)
 N. venatoria Rainbow, 1914 (type) — Australia (Victoria)
 N. victoria Jocqué, 1991 — Australia (Victoria)
 N. vituperata Jocqué, 1995 — Australia (Queensland)

Nostera

Nostera Jocqué, 1991 - Storeninae
 N. geoffgarretti Baehr & Jocqué, 2017 — Australia (Queensland)
 N. lynx Jocqué, 1991 (type) — Australia (Queensland, New South Wales)
 N. spinata Baehr & Jocqué, 2017 — Australia (New South Wales)
 N. trifurcata Baehr & Jocqué, 2017 — Australia (Queensland)

Nosterella

Nosterella Baehr & Jocqué, 2017 - Storeninae
 N. cavicola Baehr & Jocqué, 2017 — Australia (Queensland)
 N. christineae Baehr & Jocqué, 2017 — Australia (Queensland)
 N. diabolica Baehr & Jocqué, 2017 — Australia (New South Wales)
 N. fitzgibboni Baehr & Jocqué, 2017 — Australia (Queensland)
 N. nadgee (Jocqué, 1995) (type) — Australia (Queensland, New South Wales, Lord Howe Is.)
 N. pollardi Baehr & Jocqué, 2017 — Australia (Lord Howe Is.)

Notasteron

Notasteron Baehr, 2005 - Storeninae
 N. carnarvon Baehr, 2005 — Australia (Western Australia)
 N. lawlessi Baehr, 2005 (type) — Australia (Northern Territory, Queensland, New South Wales, Victoria)

Omucukia

Omucukia Koçak & Kemal, 2008 - Storenomorphinae
 O. angusta (Simon, 1889) — Madagascar
 O. madrela (Jocqué, 1991) (type) — Madagascar

Palaestina

Palaestina O. Pickard-Cambridge, 1872 - Zodariinae
 P. dentifera O. Pickard-Cambridge, 1872 — Israel
 P. eremica Levy, 1992 — Egypt
 P. expolita O. Pickard-Cambridge, 1872 (type) — Greece (incl. Crete), Cyprus, Turkey, Lebanon, Israel

Palfuria

Palfuria Simon, 1910 - Zodariinae
 P. caputlari Szűts & Jocqué, 2001 — Tanzania
 P. gibbosa (Lessert, 1936) — Mozambique
 P. gladiator Szűts & Jocqué, 2001 — Namibia
 P. harpago Szűts & Jocqué, 2001 — Namibia
 P. helichrysorum Szűts & Jocqué, 2001 — Malawi
 P. hirsuta Szűts & Jocqué, 2001 — Zambia
 P. panner Jocqué, 1991 — Namibia
 P. retusa Simon, 1910 (type) — South Africa
 P. spirembolus Szűts & Jocqué, 2001 — Namibia

Palindroma

Palindroma Jocqué & Henrard, 2015 - Cryptothelinae
 P. aleykyela Jocqué & Henrard, 2015 — Tanzania, Malawi
 P. avonova Jocqué & Henrard, 2015 — Tanzania
 P. morogorom Jocqué & Henrard, 2015 (type) — Tanzania
 P. obmoimiombo Jocqué & Henrard, 2015 — Congo
 P. sinis Jocqué & Henrard, 2015 — Tanzania

Parazodarion

Parazodarion Ovtchinnikov, Ahmad & Gurko, 2009 - Incertae Sedis
 P. raddei (Simon, 1889) — United Arab Emirates, Iran, Kazakhstan, Uzbekistan, Turkmenistan, Tajikistan, Afghanistan

Pax

Pax Levy, 1990 - Storeninae
Pax ellipita (Zamani & Marusik, 2021) — Iran
Pax engediensis Levy, 1990 — Israel
Pax islamita (Simon, 1873) — Turkey, Israel, Syria, Lebanon
Pax leila (Zamani & Marusik, 2021) — Iran
Pax libani (Simon, 1873) — Israel, Lebanon
Pax meadi (O. Pickard-Cambridge, 1872) — Israel, Jordan
Pax palmonii Levy, 1990 — Israel

Pentasteron

Pentasteron Baehr & Jocqué, 2001 - Storeninae
 P. intermedium Baehr & Jocqué, 2001 — Southern Australia
 P. isobelae Baehr & Jocqué, 2001 — Australia (Queensland, New South Wales)
 P. oscitans Baehr & Jocqué, 2001 — Australia (New South Wales)
 P. parasimplex Baehr & Jocqué, 2001 — Australia (Victoria)
 P. securifer Baehr & Jocqué, 2001 — Australia (Western Australia)
 P. simplex Baehr & Jocqué, 2001 (type) — Australia (Queensland, New South Wales)
 P. sordidum Baehr & Jocqué, 2001 — Australia (New South Wales, Victoria)
 P. storosoides Baehr & Jocqué, 2001 — Australia (New South Wales, Victoria)

Phenasteron

Phenasteron Baehr & Jocqué, 2001 - Storeninae
 P. longiconductor Baehr & Jocqué, 2001 (type) — Australia (Western Australia, Victoria)
 P. machinosum Baehr & Jocqué, 2001 — Australia (South Australia)

Platnickia

Platnickia Jocqué, 1991 - Storeninae
 P. bergi (Simon, 1895) — Chile, Argentina, Falkland Is.
 P. bolson Grismado & Platnick, 2008 — Chile, Argentina
 P. elegans (Nicolet, 1849) (type) — Chile, Argentina
 P. roble Grismado & Platnick, 2008 — Chile
 P. wedalen Grismado & Platnick, 2008 — Chile, Argentina, Falkland Is.

Procydrela

Procydrela Jocqué, 1999 - Cydrelinae
 P. limacola Jocqué, 1999 — South Africa
 P. procursor Jocqué, 1999 (type) — South Africa

† Propago

Propago Petrunkevitch, 1963 - Incertae Sedis
 † P. debilis Petrunkevitch, 1963 (type) — Neogene Chiapas amber

Psammoduon

Psammoduon Jocqué, 1991 - Cydrelinae
 P. arenicola (Simon, 1910) — South Africa
 P. canosum (Simon, 1910) — Namibia, South Africa
 P. deserticola (Simon, 1910) (type) — Namibia

Psammorygma

Psammorygma Jocqué, 1991 - Cydrelinae
 P. aculeatum (Karsch, 1878) — South Africa
 P. caligatum Jocqué, 1991 (type) — Namibia
 P. rutilans (Simon, 1887) — South Africa

Pseudasteron

Pseudasteron Jocqué & Baehr, 2001 - Storeninae
 P. simile Jocqué & Baehr, 2001 (type) — Australia (Queensland)

Ranops

Ranops Jocqué, 1991 - Zodariinae
 R. caprivi Jocqué, 1991 (type) — Namibia, Zimbabwe
 R. dippenaarae Russell-Smith & Jocqué, 2015 — Tanzania
 R. robinae Jocqué & Henrard, 2020 — South Africa
 R. tharinae Jocqué & Henrard, 2020 — Botswana
 R. wandae Jocqué & Henrard, 2020 — Namibia

Rotundrela

Rotundrela Jocqué, 1999 - Cydrelinae
 R. orbiculata Jocqué, 1999 — South Africa
 R. rotunda Jocqué, 1999 (type) — South Africa

Selamia

Selamia Simon, 1873 - Storeninae
 S. numidica Jocqué & Bosmans, 2001 — Algeria, Tunisia
 S. reticulata (Simon, 1870) (type) — Western Mediterranean
 S. tribulosa (Simon, 1909) — Morocco

Spinasteron

Spinasteron Baehr, 2003 - Storeninae
 S. arenarium Baehr, 2003 — Australia (Western Australia)
 S. barlee Baehr, 2003 — Australia (Western Australia)
 S. casuarium Baehr, 2003 — Australia (Western Australia)
 S. cavasteroides Baehr & Churchill, 2003 — Australia (Western Australia, Northern Territory)
 S. knowlesi Baehr, 2003 — Australia (Western Australia)
 S. kronestedti Baehr, 2003 — Australia (Western Australia)
 S. lemleyi Baehr, 2003 — Australia (Western Australia)
 S. longbottomi Baehr, 2003 — Australia (Western Australia)
 S. ludwigi Baehr & Churchill, 2003 — Australia (Northern Territory)
 S. mjobergi Baehr, 2003 — Australia (Western Australia)
 S. nigriceps Baehr, 2003 (type) — Australia (Northern Territory)
 S. peron Baehr, 2003 — Australia (Western Australia)
 S. ramboldi Baehr & Churchill, 2003 — Australia (Northern Territory)
 S. sanford Baehr, 2003 — Australia (Northern Territory)
 S. spatulanum Baehr & Churchill, 2003 — Australia (Northern Territory)
 S. waldockae Baehr, 2003 — Australia (Western Australia)
 S. weiri Baehr, 2003 — Australia (Western Australia)
 S. westi Baehr, 2003 — Australia (Western Australia)
 S. woodstock Baehr, 2003 — Australia (Western Australia)

† Spinizodarion

Spinizodarion Wunderlich, 2004 - Zodariinae
 † S. ananulum Wunderlich, 2004 (type) — Palaeogene Baltic amber

Storena

Storena Walckenaer, 1805 - Storeninae
S. analis Simon, 1893 — Ecuador
S. annulipes (L. Koch, 1867) — Australia (Queensland)
S. aspinosa Jocqué & Baehr, 1992 — Australia (South Australia)
S. botenella Jocqué & Baehr, 1992 — Australia (South Australia)
S. braccata (L. Koch, 1865) — Australia (New South Wales)
S. canalensis Berland, 1924 — New Caledonia
S. caporiaccoi Brignoli, 1983 — Venezuela
S. charlotte Jocqué & Baehr, 1992 — Australia (Queensland, Victoria)
S. cochleare Jocqué & Baehr, 1992 — Australia (New South Wales)
S. colossea Rainbow, 1920 — Australia (Lord Howe Is.)
S. cyanea Walckenaer, 1805 — Eastern Australia
S. daviesae Jocqué & Baehr, 1992 — Australia (Queensland)
S. deserticola Jocqué, 1991 — Australia (Northern Territory)
S. digitulus Jocqué & Baehr, 1992 — Australia (Queensland)
S. eximia Simon, 1908 — Australia (Western Australia)
S. flavipes (Urquhart, 1893) — Australia (Tasmania)
S. flavopicta (Simon, 1876) — Indonesia (Moluccas)
S. flexuosa (Thorell, 1895) — Myanmar
S. formosa Thorell, 1870 — Australia (mainland, Lord Howe Is.)
S. fungina Jocqué & Baehr, 1992 — Australia (Western Australia)
S. graeffei (L. Koch, 1866) — Australia (New South Wales)
S. harveyi Jocqué & Baehr, 1995 — Australia (Western Australia)
S. ignava Jocqué & Baehr, 1992 — Australia (Northern Territory)
S. inornata Rainbow, 1916 — Australia (Queensland)
S. kraepelini Simon, 1905 — Indonesia (Java)
S. lebruni Simon, 1886 — Argentina
S. lesserti Berland, 1938 — Vanuatu
S. longiducta Jocqué & Baehr, 1992 — Australia (Queensland)
S. maculata O. Pickard-Cambridge, 1869 — Australia (Queensland)
S. mainae Jocqué & Baehr, 1995 — Australia (New South Wales, Victoria)
S. martini Jocqué & Baehr, 1992 — Australia (Northern Territory)
S. mathematica Jocqué & Baehr, 1992 — Australia (Northern Territory)
S. metallica Jocqué & Baehr, 1992 — Australia (Queensland)
S. nana Jocqué & Baehr, 1992 — Australia (Victoria)
S. nuga Jocqué & Baehr, 1992 — Australia (Queensland)
S. ornata (Bradley, 1877) — Australia (Queensland)
S. parvicavum Jocqué & Baehr, 1992 — Australia (Queensland)
S. parvula Berland, 1938 — Vanuatu
S. paucipunctata Jocqué & Baehr, 1992 — Australia (Western Australia)
S. procedens Jocqué & Baehr, 1992 — Australia (Queensland)
S. rainbowi Berland, 1924 — New Caledonia
S. rastellata Strand, 1913 — Central Australia
S. raveni Jocqué & Baehr, 1992 — Australia (Queensland)
S. recta Jocqué & Baehr, 1992 — Australia (Western Australia, Queensland, New South Wales)
S. recurvata Jocqué & Baehr, 1992 — Australia (Queensland, New South Wales, Victoria)
S. rotunda Jocqué & Baehr, 1992 — Australia (New South Wales)
S. rufescens Thorell, 1881 — New Guinea, Australia (Queensland)
S. rugosa Simon, 1889 — New Caledonia
S. scita Jocqué & Baehr, 1992 — Australia (Queensland)
S. silvicola Berland, 1924 — New Caledonia
S. sinuosa Jocqué & Baehr, 1992 — Australia (Western Australia)
S. tenera (Thorell, 1895) — Myanmar
S. tricolor Simon, 1908 — Australia (Western Australia)
S. variegata O. Pickard-Cambridge, 1869 — Australia (Western Australia, South Australia)
S. zavattarii Caporiacco, 1941 — Ethiopia

Storenomorpha

Storenomorpha Simon, 1884 - Storenomorphinae
 S. abramovi Logunov, 2010 — Vietnam
 S. anne Jäger, 2007 — Laos
 S. arboccoae Jocqué & Bosmans, 1989 — Myanmar
 S. comottoi Simon, 1884 (type) — Myanmar
 S. dejiangensis Jiang, Guo, Yu & Chen, 2016 — China
 S. falcata Zhang & Zhu, 2010 — China
 S. hainanensis Jin & Chen, 2009 — China
 S. hongfuchui (Barrion, Barrion-Dupo & Heong, 2013) — China (Hainan)
 S. joyaus (Tikader, 1970) — India
 S. lushanensis Yu & Chen, 2009 — China
 S. nupta Jocqué & Bosmans, 1989 — Myanmar
 S. paguma Grismado & Ramírez, 2004 — Vietnam
 S. raghavai (Patel & Reddy, 1991) — India
 S. reinholdae Jocqué & Bosmans, 1989 — Thailand
 S. stellmaculata Zhang & Zhu, 2010 — China
 S. yizhang Yin & Bao, 2008 — China
 S. yunnan Yin & Bao, 2008 — China

Storosa

Storosa Jocqué, 1991 - Storeninae
 S. obscura Jocqué, 1991 (type) — Australia (Queensland, New South Wales)
 S. tetrica (Simon, 1908) — Australia (Western Australia)

Subasteron

Subasteron Baehr & Jocqué, 2001 - Storeninae
 S. daviesae Baehr & Jocqué, 2001 (type) — Australia (Queensland)

Suffascar

Suffascar Henrard & Jocqué, 2017 - Zodariinae
 S. albolineatus Henrard & Jocqué, 2017 — Madagascar
 S. fianara Henrard & Jocqué, 2017 (type) — Madagascar
 S. fisheri Henrard & Jocqué, 2017 — Madagascar
 S. fitzpatrickae Henrard & Jocqué, 2017 — Madagascar
 S. gigas Henrard & Jocqué, 2017 — Madagascar
 S. griswoldi Henrard & Jocqué, 2017 — Madagascar
 S. macromma Henrard & Jocqué, 2017 — Madagascar
 S. micromma Henrard & Jocqué, 2017 — Madagascar
 S. nonus Henrard & Jocqué, 2017 — Madagascar
 S. scutatus Henrard & Jocqué, 2017 — Madagascar
 S. sufficiens Henrard & Jocqué, 2017 — Madagascar
 S. tofti Henrard & Jocqué, 2017 — Madagascar

Suffasia

Suffasia Jocqué, 1991 - Zodariinae
 S. ala Sen, Dhali, Saha & Raychaudhuri, 2015 — India
 S. attidiya Benjamin & Jocqué, 2000 — Sri Lanka
 S. kanchenjunga Ono, 2006 — Nepal
 S. keralaensis Sudhikumar, Jocqué & Sebastian, 2009 — India
 S. mahasumana Benjamin & Jocqué, 2000 — Sri Lanka
 S. martensi Ono, 2006 — Nepal
 S. tigrina (Simon, 1893) (type) — India
 S. tumegaster Jocqué, 1992 — Nepal

Suffrica

Suffrica Henrard & Jocqué, 2015 - Zodariinae
 S. chawia Henrard & Jocqué, 2015 — Kenya
 S. exotica Henrard & Jocqué, 2015 (type) — Tanzania
 S. gus Henrard & Jocqué, 2015 — Tanzania

Systenoplacis

Systenoplacis Simon, 1907 - Incertae Sedis
 S. biguttatus Jocqué, 2009 — Cameroon
 S. biunguis (Strand, 1913) — Central Africa
 S. fagei (Lawrence, 1937) — South Africa
 S. falconeri (Caporiacco, 1949) — Kenya
 S. giltayi (Lessert, 1929) — Congo
 S. howelli Jocqué, 2009 — Tanzania
 S. maculatus (Marx, 1893) — Central, East Africa
 S. manga Jocqué, 2009 — Tanzania
 S. maritimus Jocqué, 2009 — Tanzania
 S. michielsi Jocqué, 2009 — Kenya
 S. microguttatus Jocqué, 2009 — Tanzania
 S. minimus Jocqué, 2009 — Tanzania
 S. multipunctatus (Berland, 1920) — Kenya
 S. obstructus Jocqué, 2009 — Tanzania
 S. patens Jocqué, 2009 — Tanzania
 S. quinqueguttatus Jocqué, 2009 — Nigeria
 S. scharffi Jocqué, 2009 — Tanzania
 S. septemguttatus Simon, 1907 (type) — Guinea-Bissau
 S. thea Jocqué, 2009 — Tanzania
 S. turbatus Jocqué, 2009 — Ivory Coast
 S. vandami (Hewitt, 1916) — South Africa
 S. waruii Jocqué, 2009 — Kenya, Tanzania

T-Z

Tenedos

Tenedos O. Pickard-Cambridge, 1897 - Storeninae
 T. andes Jocqué & Baert, 2002 — Colombia
 T. asteronoides Jocqué & Baert, 2002 — Ecuador
 T. banos Jocqué & Baert, 2002 — Ecuador
 T. barronus (Chamberlin, 1925) — Panama
 T. brescoviti Jocqué & Baert, 2002 — Brazil
 T. capote Jocqué & Baert, 2002 — Colombia
 T. carlosprestesi Candiani, Bonaldo & Brescovit, 2008 — Brazil
 T. certus (Jocqué & Ubick, 1991) — Costa Rica, Panama
 T. convexus Jocqué & Baert, 2002 — Venezuela
 T. cufodontii (Reimoser, 1939) — Costa Rica, Panama
 T. eduardoi (Mello-Leitão, 1925) — Brazil
 T. equatorialis Jocqué & Baert, 2002 — Ecuador
 T. estari Jocqué & Baert, 2002 — Peru
 T. fartilis Jocqué & Baert, 2002 — Ecuador
 T. figaro Jocqué & Baert, 2002 — Ecuador
 T. garoa Candiani, Bonaldo & Brescovit, 2008 — Brazil
 T. grandis Jocqué & Baert, 2002 — Panama, Ecuador
 T. hirsutus (Mello-Leitão, 1941) — Brazil
 T. hoeferi Jocqué & Baert, 2002 — Brazil
 T. honduras Jocqué & Baert, 2002 — Honduras
 T. inca Jocqué & Baert, 2002 — Peru
 T. inflatus Jocqué & Baert, 2002 — Peru
 T. infrarmatus Jocqué & Baert, 2002 — Brazil
 T. jocquei Quijano-Cuervo & Galvis, 2018 — Colombia
 T. juninus Jocqué & Baert, 2002 — Peru
 T. lautus O. Pickard-Cambridge, 1897 (type) — Guatemala
 T. ligulatus Jocqué & Baert, 2002 — Colombia
 T. major (Keyserling, 1891) — Brazil
 T. microlaminatus Jocqué & Baert, 2002 — Peru
 T. minor (Keyserling, 1891) — Brazil
 T. nancyae Candiani, Bonaldo & Brescovit, 2008 — Peru
 T. parinca Jocqué & Baert, 2002 — Peru
 T. peckorum Jocqué & Baert, 2002 — Colombia
 T. persulcatus Jocqué & Baert, 2002 — Ecuador
 T. procreator Jocqué & Baert, 2002 — Brazil
 T. quadrangulatus Jocqué & Baert, 2002 — Peru
 T. quinquangulatus Jocqué & Baert, 2002 — Peru
 T. reygeli Jocqué & Baert, 2002 — Brazil
 T. serrulatus Jocqué & Baert, 2002 — Ecuador
 T. sumaco Jocqué & Baert, 2002 — Ecuador
 T. trilobatus Jocqué & Baert, 2002 — Colombia
 T. ufoides Jocqué & Baert, 2002 — Venezuela
 T. ultimus Jocqué & Baert, 2002 — Colombia
 T. venezolanus Jocqué & Baert, 2002 — Venezuela

Thaumastochilus

Thaumastochilus Simon, 1897 - Storeninae
 T. martini Simon, 1897 (type) — South Africa
 T. termitomimus Jocqué, 1994 — South Africa

Tropasteron

Tropasteron Baehr, 2003 - Storeninae
 T. andreae Baehr, 2003 — Australia (Queensland)
 T. cardwell Baehr, 2003 — Australia (Queensland)
 T. cleveland Baehr, 2003 (type) — Australia (Queensland)
 T. cooki Baehr, 2003 — Australia (Queensland)
 T. daviesae Baehr, 2003 — Australia (Queensland)
 T. eacham Baehr, 2003 — Australia (Queensland)
 T. fox Baehr, 2003 — Australia (Queensland)
 T. halifax Baehr, 2003 — Australia (Queensland)
 T. heatherae Baehr, 2003 — Australia (Queensland)
 T. julatten Baehr, 2003 — Australia (Queensland)
 T. luteipes Baehr, 2003 — Australia (Queensland)
 T. magnum Baehr, 2003 — Australia (Queensland)
 T. malbon Baehr, 2003 — Australia (Queensland)
 T. monteithi Baehr, 2003 — Australia (Queensland)
 T. palmerston Baehr, 2003 — Australia (Queensland)
 T. pseudomagnum Baehr, 2003 — Australia (Queensland)
 T. raveni Baehr, 2003 — Australia (Queensland)
 T. robertsi Baehr, 2003 — Australia (Queensland)
 T. splendens Baehr, 2003 — Australia (Queensland)
 T. thompsoni Baehr, 2003 — Australia (Queensland)
 T. tribulation Baehr, 2003 — Australia (Queensland)
 T. yeatesi Baehr, 2003 — Australia (Queensland)

Tropizodium

Tropizodium Jocqué & Churchill, 2005 - Incertae Sedis
Tropizodium bengalense (Tikader & Patel, 1975) – India
Tropizodium kalami Prajapati, Murthappa, Sankaran & Sebastian, 2016 – India
Tropizodium kovvurense (Reddy & Patel, 1993) – India
Tropizodium molokai Jocqué & Churchill, 2005 – Hawaii
Tropizodium murphyorum Dankittipakul, Jocqué & Singtripop, 2012 – Bali
Tropizodium peregrinum Jocqué & Churchill, 2005 – Australia (Northern Territory). Introduced to Reunion
Tropizodium poonaense (Tikader, 1981) – India
Tropizodium serraferum (Lin & Li, 2009) – China
Tropizodium siam Dankittipakul, Jocqué & Singtripop, 2012 – Thailand
Tropizodium trispinosum (Suman, 1967) – Hawaii, French Polynesia (Society Is., Tuamotu)
Tropizodium viridurbium Prajapati, Murthappa, Sankaran & Sebastian, 2016 – India

Trygetus

Trygetus Simon, 1882 - Zodariinae
 T. berlandi Denis, 1952 — Morocco
 T. gromovi Marusik, 2011 — Turkmenistan
 T. jacksoni Marusik & Guseinov, 2003 — Azerbaijan, Iran
 T. nitidissimus Simon, 1882 — Yemen, Djibouti
 T. rectus Jocqué, 2011 — United Arab Emirates
 T. riyadhensis Ono & Jocqué, 1986 — Egypt, Saudi Arabia
 T. sexoculatus (O. Pickard-Cambridge, 1872) (type) — Israel, Egypt

Workmania

Workmania Dankittipakul, Jocqué & Singtripop, 2012 - Incertae Sedis
 W. botuliformis Dankittipakul, Jocqué & Singtripop, 2012 (type) — Thailand, Malaysia, Singapore, Indonesia (Sumatra)
 W. juvenca (Workman, 1896) — Malaysia, Singapore, Indonesia (Borneo)

Zillimata

Zillimata Jocqué, 1995 - Storeninae
 Z. scintillans (O. Pickard-Cambridge, 1869) (type) — Australia (Western Australia, South Australia, Queensland, Victoria)

Zodariellum

Zodariellum Andreeva & Tystshenko, 1968 - Zodariinae
 Z. surprisum Andreeva & Tystshenko, 1968 (type) — Central Asia

† Zodariodamus

Zodariodamus Wunderlich, 2004 - Storenomorphinae
 † Z. recurvatus Wunderlich, 2004 (type) — Palaeogene Baltic amber

Zodarion

Zodarion Walckenaer, 1826 - Zodariinae
Zodarion abantense Wunderlich, 1980 – Turkey, Georgia, Russia
Zodarion abnorme Denis, 1952 – Morocco
Zodarion aculeatum Chyzer, 1897 – Bulgaria, Romania, Serbia, Macedonia
Zodarion aerium Simon, 1890 – Yemen
Zodarion affine (Simon, 1870) – Spain
Zodarion agricola Bouseksou & Abrous, 2021 – Algeria
Zodarion alacre (Simon, 1870) – Portugal, Spain
Zodarion albipatellare Bosmans, 2009 – Crete
Zodarion alentejanum Pekár & Carvalho, 2011 – Portugal
Zodarion algarvense Bosmans, 1994 – Portugal
Zodarion algiricum (Lucas, 1846) – Algeria
Zodarion andalusiacum Jocqué, 1991 – Portugal, Spain
Zodarion arabelae Bosmans, 2009 – Greece
Zodarion arachnaio Bosmans, 2009 – Greece
Zodarion atlanticum Pekár & Cardoso, 2005 – Portugal, Azores
Zodarion atriceps (O. Pickard-Cambridge, 1872) – Lebanon
Zodarion attikaense Wunderlich, 1980 – Greece
Zodarion aurorae Weiss, 1982 – Romania
Zodarion azrouense Bosmans & Benhalima, 2020 – Morocco
Zodarion bacelarae Pekár, 2003 – Portugal
Zodarion barbarae Bosmans, 2009 – Greece
Zodarion beroni Komnenov & Chatzaki, 2016 – Greece
Zodarion berryi Bosmans & Draney, 2018 – USA
Zodarion beticum Denis, 1957 – Spain
Zodarion bicoloripes (Denis, 1959) – Algeria
Zodarion bigaense Bosmans, Özkütük, Varli & Kunt, 2014 – Turkey
Zodarion blagoevi Bosmans, 2009 – Bulgaria, Greece
Zodarion bosmansi Pekár & Cardoso, 2005 – Portugal
Zodarion bozdagensis Coşar, 2021 – Turkey
Zodarion buettikeri (Ono & Jocqué, 1986) – Saudi Arabia, Iran
Zodarion caporiaccoi Roewer, 1942 – Italy
Zodarion caucasicum Dunin & Nenilin, 1987 – Azerbaijan
Zodarion cesari Pekár, 2011 – Spain, France (Corsica)
Zodarion christae Bosmans, 2009 – Greece, Turkey
Zodarion confusum Denis, 1935 – Italy, Turkey
Zodarion costablancae Bosmans, 1994 – Portugal, Spain
Zodarion costapratae Pekár, 2011 – Portugal
Zodarion couseransense Bosmans, 1997 – France
Zodarion crewsae (Coşar, Danışman & Kunt, 2022) – Turkey
Zodarion cyrenaicum Denis, 1935 – Libya, Egypt, Israel
Zodarion danismani Coşar, 2021 – Turkey
Zodarion deccanensis (Tikader & Malhotra, 1976) – India
Zodarion deltshevi Bosmans, 2009 – Turkey
Zodarion diatretum Denis, 1935 – Spain
Zodarion dispar Denis, 1935 – Algeria
Zodarion duriense Cardoso, 2003 – Portugal
Zodarion egens Denis, 1937 – Unknown
Zodarion elegans (Simon, 1873) – Southern Europe, North Africa
Zodarion emarginatum (Simon, 1873) – France, Corsica, Malta, Greece
Zodarion emilijae (Deltshev & Naumova, 2022) – North Macedonia
Zodarion epirense Brignoli, 1984 – Bulgaria, Greece
Zodarion ericorum Bosmans, 2020 – Morocco
Zodarion evvoia Bosmans, 2009 – Greece
Zodarion expers (O. Pickard-Cambridge, 1876) – Egypt, Israel
Zodarion fazanicum Denis, 1938 – Libya
Zodarion frenatum Simon, 1885 – Italy, Bulgaria, Greece, Crete, Corfu, Turkey
Zodarion fulvonigrum (Simon, 1874) – France
Zodarion fuscum (Simon, 1870) – Britain, France, Spain, Portugal
Zodarion gallicum (Simon, 1873) – France, Corsica, Italy, Balkans, Turkey
Zodarion gaziantepense Danışman & Coşar, 2021 – Turkey
Zodarion germanicum (C. L. Koch, 1837) – Europe
Zodarion geshur Levy, 2007 – Israel
Zodarion gracilitibiale Denis, 1934 – France, Italy
Zodarion graecum (C. L. Koch, 1843) – Eastern Europe, Lebanon, Israel
Zodarion granulatum Kulczyński, 1908 – Cyprus, Greece, Turkey, Lebanon, Israel
Zodarion gregua Bosmans, 1994 – Portugal, Spain
Zodarion guadianense Cardoso, 2003 – Portugal
Zodarion hamatum Wiehle, 1964 – Italy, Austria, Slovenia
Zodarion hauseri Brignoli, 1984 – North Macedonia, Bulgaria, Greece
Zodarion immaculatum Denis, 1962 – Libya
Zodarion imroz Dimitrov, 2020 – Bulgaria, Turkey
Zodarion inderensis (Ponomarev, 2007) – Kazakhstan
Zodarion isabellinum (Simon, 1870) – Spain, Morocco
Zodarion italicum (Canestrini, 1868) – Europe
Zodarion izmirense Danışman & Coşar, 2020 – Turkey
Zodarion jansseni Bosmans, 2009 – Greece
Zodarion jeanclaudeledouxi Bosmans & Benhalima, 2020 – Morocco
Zodarion jozefienae Bosmans, 1994 – Portugal, Spain
Zodarion judaeorum Levy, 1992 – Israel
Zodarion kabylianum Denis, 1937 – Algeria
Zodarion karpathos Bosmans, 2009 – Greece
Zodarion killini Bosmans, 2009 – Greece
Zodarion konradi Bosmans, 2009 – Greece
Zodarion korgei Wunderlich, 1980 – Turkey
Zodarion kossamos Bosmans, 2009 – Greece
Zodarion kunti Coşar, Danışman & Yağmur, 2021 – Turkey
Zodarion luctuosum (O. Pickard-Cambridge, 1872) – Israel
Zodarion ludibundum Simon, 1914 – Corsica, Sicily, Algeria
Zodarion lusitanicum Cardoso, 2003 – Portugal, Spain
Zodarion lutipes (O. Pickard-Cambridge, 1872) – Cyprus, Israel, Lebanon, Jordan
Zodarion machadoi Denis, 1939 – Portugal, Spain, Azores
Zodarion maculatum (Simon, 1870) – Portugal, Spain, France, Sicily, Morocco
Zodarion maghrebense Bosmans & Benhalima, 2020 – Morocco, Algeria
Zodarion mallorca Bosmans, 1994 – Mallorca
Zodarion marginiceps Simon, 1914 – Spain, France
Zodarion merlijni Bosmans, 1994 – Portugal, Spain
Zodarion mesranense Bouragba & Bosmans, 2012 – Algeria
Zodarion messiniense Bosmans, 2009 – Greece
Zodarion minutum Bosmans, 1994 – Spain, Mallorca, Ibiza
Zodarion modestum (Simon, 1870) – Spain
Zodarion montesacrense Bosmans, 2019 – Italy
Zodarion morosoides Bosmans, 2009 – Greece
Zodarion morosum Denis, 1935 – Macedonia, Bulgaria, Albania, Greece, Turkey, Ukraine, Russia
Zodarion mostafai Benhalima & Bosmans, 2020 – Morocco
Zodarion murphyorum Bosmans, 1994 – Spain
Zodarion musarum Brignoli, 1984 – Greece
Zodarion nesiotes Denis, 1965 – Canary Is.
Zodarion nesiotoides Wunderlich, 1992 – Canary Is.
Zodarion nigriceps (Simon, 1873) – Corsica, Sardinia
Zodarion nigrifemur Caporiacco, 1948 – Greece
Zodarion nitidum (Audouin, 1826) (type species) – North Africa, Middle East
Zodarion noordami Bosmans, 2009 – Greece
Zodarion odem Levy, 2007 – Israel
Zodarion ogeri Bosmans & Benhalima, 2020 – Morocco
Zodarion ohridense Wunderlich, 1973 – Bulgaria, North Macedonia, Croatia, Greece, Czechia
Zodarion ovatum B. S. Zhang & F. Zhang, 2019 – Italy
Zodarion ozkutuki Coşar & Danışman, 2021 – Turkey
Zodarion pacificum Bosmans, 2009 – Croatia, Bosnia
Zodarion pallidum Denis, 1952 – Morocco
Zodarion pantaleonii Bosmans & Pantini, 2019 – Italy (Sardinia)
Zodarion parashi Wunderlich, 2022 – Greece
Zodarion petrobium Dunin & Zacharjan, 1991 – Azerbaijan, Armenia
Zodarion pileolonotatum Denis, 1935 – Libya
Zodarion pirini Drensky, 1921 – Bulgaria, Greece
Zodarion planum B. S. Zhang & F. Zhang, 2019 – China
Zodarion pseudoelegans Denis, 1934 – Spain, France, Ibiza
Zodarion pseudonigriceps Bosmans & Pantini, 2019 – Italy (Sardinia)
Zodarion pusio Simon, 1914 – France, Italy, Tunisia, Croatia, Bosnia-Hercegovina, Slovenia
Zodarion pythium Denis, 1935 – Greece
Zodarion remotum Denis, 1935 – Corsica, Italy
Zodarion reticulatum Kulczyński, 1908 – Cyprus
Zodarion robertbosmans Wunderlich, 2017 – Turkey
Zodarion rubidum Simon, 1914 – Europe (introduced in USA, Canada)
Zodarion rudyi Bosmans, 1994 – Portugal, Spain
Zodarion ruffoi Caporiacco, 1951 – France, Italy, Turkey
Zodarion samos Bosmans, 2009 – Greece
Zodarion santorini Bosmans, 2009 – Greece
Zodarion sardum Bosmans, 1997 – Sardinia
Zodarion scutatum Wunderlich, 1980 – Slovenia, Croatia
Zodarion segurense Bosmans, 1994 – Spain
Zodarion sharurensis (Zamani & Marusik, 2022) – Azerbaijan
Zodarion siirtensis Coşar, 2021 – Turkey
Zodarion simplex Jocqué, 2011 – United Arab Emirates
Zodarion soror (Simon, 1873) – Corsica
Zodarion spinibarbe Wunderlich, 1973 – Crete
Zodarion styliferum (Simon, 1870) – Portugal, Spain, Madeira
Zodarion styliferum extraneum (Denis, 1935) – Portugal
Zodarion sungar (Jocqué, 1991) – Turkey, Iraq
Zodarion talyschicum Dunin & Nenilin, 1987 – Azerbaijan, Iran
Zodarion thoni Nosek, 1905 – Eastern Europe to Azerbaijan
Zodarion timidum (Simon, 1874) – Spain, France
Zodarion trianguliferum Denis, 1952 – Morocco
Zodarion tuber (Wunderlich, 2022) – Portugal
Zodarion tunetiacum Strand, 1906 – Tunisia
Zodarion turcicum Wunderlich, 1980 – Bulgaria, Greece, Turkey
Zodarion turkesi Coşar & Danışman, 2021 – Turkey
Zodarion valentii Bosmans, Loverre & Addante, 2019 – Morocco, Algeria, Spain, Italy
Zodarion van Bosmans, 2009 – Turkey
Zodarion vanimpei Bosmans, 1994 – Spain
Zodarion vankeerorum Bosmans, 2009 – Greece
Zodarion varoli Akpınar, 2016 – Turkey
Zodarion vicinum Denis, 1935 – England, Italy
Zodarion viduum Denis, 1937 – Portugal
Zodarion walsinghami Denis, 1937 – Algeria
Zodarion weissi (Deltshev & Naumova, 2022) – Bulgaria
Zodarion wesolowskae Bosmans & Benhalima, 2020 – Morocco
Zodarion yagmuri Coşar & Danışman, 2021 – Turkey
Zodarion yemenensis Jocqué & van Harten, 2015 – Yemen
Zodarion zorba Bosmans, 2009 – Greece

References

Zodariidae